{{Speciesbox
| image = Diplolaena mollis.jpg
| image_caption = Diplolaena mollis flower & foliage
| genus = Diplolaena
| species = mollis
| authority = Paul G.Wilson
}}Diplolaena mollis''' is a species of flowering plant in the family Rutaceae and is endemic to the west coast of Western Australia. It has broadly elliptic or egg-shaped, leathery leaves that are densely covered in hairs and reddish, pendulous flowers.  

The inner row of bracts barely longer than outer bracts, narrowly oblong, pointed, thin, almost hairless. Flowering occurs from May or July to September.

Taxonomy
This species was first formally described in 1998 by Paul G. Wilson and the description was published in the journal Nuytsia.

Distribution and habitatDiplolaena mollis'' grows on the central west coast of Western Australia north of Geraldton to Shark Bay, in scrubland in sandy situations over limestone.

References

External links

Sapindales of Australia
Rosids of Western Australia
Garden plants of Australia
Taxa named by Paul G. Wilson
Zanthoxyloideae